John Cok (fl. 1420) of Chichester, Sussex, was an English politician.

He was a Member (MP) of the Parliament of England for Chichester in 1420.

References

Year of birth missing
Year of death missing
English MPs 1420
People from Chichester